Long Beach's Laugh Factory is part of the Laugh Factory chain of comedy clubs owned by Jamie Masada.
It is located at South Pine Avenue in Long Beach, California. It is the 4th Laugh Factory to open and the 3rd in Southern California.

The $10 million, 670-seat, 12,000-square-foot venue is the largest comedy venue in the world.

The Laugh Factory Long Beach held its Grand Opening on September 20, 2008.

Stand-Up Comedy Hall of Fame and Museum

The Long Beach Laugh Factory is home to the official Laugh Factory Stand-Up Comedy Hall of Fame and Museum, which holds comedy memorabilia from notable comedians.

References

External links
 Laugh Factory Official Site

Laugh Factory
Comedy clubs in California
Tourist attractions in Long Beach, California
2008 establishments in California
Buildings and structures in Long Beach, California